Ikechosaurus is an extinct genus of choristodere reptile which existed in China and Mongolia during the Early Cretaceous. It contains the species Ikechosaurus sunailinae and Ikechosaurus gaoi. It belongs to the crocodilian-like clade Neochoristodera and was initially assigned to the Champsosauridae by Sigogneau-Russell (1981). Compared to other neochoristoderes, Ikechosaurus has a rather simple dentition, lacking the speciations seen in latter species. It also has parasphenoid palatal teeth, a feature not seen in any other choristodere.

References

Choristodera
Cretaceous reptiles of Asia
Cretaceous choristoderes
Prehistoric reptile genera
Fossil taxa described in 1981